Alexander Buchanan (July 19, 1980 – March 1, 2018), better known by his stage name Bender, was a Canadian rapper.

He was a member of the group Flight Distance and a former King of the Dot champion. Bender was also a professional visual artist.

Bender died on March 1, 2018, aged 37, in Montreal, Quebec, Canada. No cause of death has been released, but an article has reported that he may have died from sleep apnea.

Discography

Albums
Bender
 The Squidmilker Instrumentals (2004)

Flight Distance (Bender with Patience & DJ Calkuta)
 Run for Your Lives! (2005)
 Bad Information (2011)
 High Priests of Low-Life (2014)
 Harmony Chlorine (2018)

EPs, singles
EPs
 The Warning Shot (2005) (with Flight Distance)

Singles
 "Real Teeth" (2010) (with Flight Distance)
 "Worth" (2013) (with Flight Distance)

Guest appearances
 24/7 – "White Chalk" (2010)
 Noah23 – "Air Guitar" from Heart of Rock (2010)
 24/7 – "Pulling Teeth" from A.I. Project (2012)
 Charron – "Go In" from Bath Salts & Vinegar Chips (2013)
 Giant Gorilla Dog Thing – "Stonewall" from Horse (2014)
 Noah23 x DJ Coutz – "Campy Squalor" from Discordian Pope (2016)

See also

Canadian hip hop

References

External links
 
 Official website of hip hop in Canada

1980 births
2018 deaths
Musicians from Ottawa
21st-century Canadian rappers
Underground rappers
Canadian male rappers
21st-century Canadian male musicians